Goussainville is a commune in the Eure-et-Loir department in northern France. In January 2015 it merged with the former commune of Champagne.

Population

See also
Communes of the Eure-et-Loir department

References

Communes of Eure-et-Loir